Ralph Ross "Dutch" Ricker (January 31, 1908 – February 7, 1987) was an American football coach. He served as the head football coach at Dickinson College in Carlisle, Pennsylvania from 1946 to 1949 and Lebanon Valley College in Annville, Pennsylvania from 1950 to 1953.

A native of Carlisle, Pennsylvania, Ricker played college football at Pennsylvania State University before graduating with Bachelor of Arts and Master of Arts degrees in history. Ricker began his coaching career in 1930 at Lock Haven High in Lock Haven, Pennsylvania at head football coach. In 1934, he moved to Abington High School in Abington, Pennsylvania, where he was an assistant football coach.

Head coaching record

College

References

External links
 

1908 births
1987 deaths
Dickinson Red Devils football coaches
Lebanon Valley Flying Dutchmen football coaches
West Chester Golden Rams football coaches
High school football coaches in Pennsylvania
Penn State Nittany Lions football players
People from Carlisle, Pennsylvania
Coaches of American football from Pennsylvania
Players of American football from Pennsylvania